The Martin Handasyde No.3 was an early British  single-seat monoplane design, built in partnership by H.P. Martin and George Handasyde. Only one was built.

Design and development
The  Martin-Handasyde No.3 bore a strong resemblance to the Antoinette monoplanes, with a slender  wood-covered triangular section fuselage, and tapered wings which were braced by mid-span kingposts.  Lateral control was by wing-warping and the angle of incidence of the wings varied from 5° at the wing root to zero at the tip.  The undercarriage consisted of a pair of wheels on a cross-axle supplemented by a forward-projecting curved skid.  It was initially powered by a  Antoinette V-8 engine. This was later changed for a  J.A.P.

It was first flown at Brooklands by H.P. Martin during November 1910, and was flown throughout 1912 by Graham Gilmour, who was eventually killed in the aircraft when it suffered a mid-air structural failure over Richmond Park on 17 February 1912.

Specifications

Notes

References

Lewis, P. British Aircraft 1809-1914 London: Putnam, 1962
The Martin-Handasyde Monoplane, Flight, 25 March 1911 

3
1910s British civil aircraft
Single-engined tractor aircraft
Aviation accidents and incidents in England
Aviation accidents and incidents in 1912
Mid-wing aircraft
Aircraft first flown in 1910